The 21st New Zealand Parliament was a term of the New Zealand Parliament. It was elected at the 1922 general election in December of that year.

1922 general election

The 1922 general election was held on Monday, 6 December in the Māori electorates and on Tuesday, 7 December in the general electorates, respectively.  A total of 80 MPs were elected; 45 represented North Island electorates, 31 represented South Island electorates, and the remaining four represented Māori electorates.  700,111 voters were enrolled and the official turnout at the election was 88.7%.

Sessions
The 21st Parliament sat for four sessions (there were two sessions in 1923), and was prorogued on 14 October 1925.

Party standings

Start of Parliament

End of Parliament

Ministries
The second Massey Ministry led by William Massey of the Reform Party had come to power in August 1919. Massey ruled until his death on 10 May 1925. Francis Bell had been acting Prime Minister during Massey's illness and took on the temporary leadership following Massey's death. Bell led the Bell Ministry from 14 to 30 May 1925, when the Reform Party elected Gordon Coates as its leader. The Coates Ministry was in place for the remainder of the parliamentary term and for the duration of the 22nd Parliament.

Reform had a narrow margin of three votes in the house if Liberal and Labour combined as they did when the house resumed in February 1923 (but Bell, Witty and Isitt voted with Massey). Hence the Government could not introduce any controversial legislation, and Massey said it was "hell most of the time".

Initial composition of the 21st Parliament

By-elections during 21st Parliament
There were a number of changes during the term of the 21st Parliament.

Notes

References

 

21